Singeyer Pass is a mountain pass on southern Baffin Island, Nunavut, Canada.

References

Arctic Cordillera
Mountain passes of Baffin Island